The St. Marys Lincolns are a junior ice hockey team based in St. Marys, Ontario, Canada.  They play in the Western division of the Greater Ontario Junior Hockey League.

History

Founded in 1956, the Lincolns have never missed a season. The team survived a rather revolutionary era in Ontario hockey. In 1964, they walked away from the old Western Ontario Junior B Hockey League and joined the Central Junior B Hockey League to avoid the eventual jump the Western made to Junior A. The Lincolns joined the current Western Junior "B" league in 1969.

Behind the Waterloo Siskins, the Lincolns are the second oldest Junior "B" team in all of Ontario.

Coaching Staff 
 Head coach - Jeff Bradley
 Assistant coach - Nathan Perrott
 Assistant coach - Mike Siddall
 Assistant coach - Noah Tooke

Season-by-season results

Sutherland Cup appearances
1963: St. Marys Lincolns defeated Kingston Frontenacs 4-games-to-1
1972: Markham Waxers defeated St. Marys Lincolns 4-games-to-1
1976: St. Marys Lincolns defeated Collingwood Blues 4-games-to-3

Notable alumni

 Bob Boughner
 Dan Bylsma
 Terry Crisp
 Matt Dalton
 Scott Driscoll (linesman)
 Josh Gratton
 Seth Griffith
 Lonnie Loach
 Don Luce
 Mark Mancari
 Rick McCann
 Mike McLaughlin (NCAA Northeastern University assistant coach)
 Steve Miller (linesman)
 Mike Minard
 Cal O'Reilly
 J. P. Parisé
 Nathan Perrott
 Matt Read
 Bryan Rodney
 Steve Shields
 John Tripp
 Jack Valiquette
 Tyson Baker NHL linesman

Coaches with NHL Experience
 Dave MacQueen
 Merlin Malinowski
 Dan Seguin
 Walter Tkaczuk

References

External links
Lincolns Webpage
GOJHL Webpage

Western Junior B Hockey League teams